The 2017 Denbighshire County Council election took place in Denbighshire, Wales, on 4 May 2017 to elect members of Denbighshire Council. This was the same day as other 2017 United Kingdom local elections. The previous elections took place in 2012 and the next all-council elections is due to take place in 2022.

Background
Though the Labour Party had ended up as the largest group, following the previous elections in 2012, they had chosen not to lead the council. The leading coalition of Conservatives, Plaid Cymru and Independents were faced with making big cost savings and there were battles over potential closure of rural schools, as well as a proposed merger between Denbighshire and Conwy county councils.

Contests took place in all except three of the 30 electoral wards.

Results

Overview
The Conservatives became the largest group on the council again, after taking seats largely from the Labour Party.

|}

Ward results

* = denotes councillor elected to this ward at the 2012 elections

(a) Election Centre/Andrew Teale source also compares the percentage vote of the lead candidate for each party in the ward

(b) Denbighshire Council results per ward also give the % turnout and numbers of registered electors

Bodelwyddan (one seat)

Corwen (one seat)

Denbigh Central (one seat)

Denbigh Lower (two seats)

Denbigh Upper/Henllan (two seats)

Colin Hughes had been elected for Labour in 2012.

Dyserth (one seat)

Efenechtyd (one seat)

Llanarmon-Yn-Lal/Llandelga (one seat)

Llanbedr Dyffryn Clwyd/Llangynhafal (one seat)

Llandrillo (one seat)

Llandyrnog (one seat)

Llanfair Dyffryn Clwyd Gwyddelwern (one seat)

Llangollen (two seats)

Llanrhaeadr-yng-Nghinmeirch (one seat)

Prestatyn Central (two seats)

Peter Duffy was elected for the Labour Party in 2012.

Prestatyn East (two seats)

Prestatyn Meliden (one seat)

Prestatyn North (three seats)

Prestatyn South West (two seats)

Rhuddlan (two seats)

Rhyl East (two seats)

Rhyl South (two seats)

Rhyl South East (three seats)

Win Mullen-James and Bill Tasker had been sitting Labour councillors, but Mullen-James was deselected by her party prior to the election.

Rhyl South West (two seats)

Rhyl West (two seats)

Ruthin (three seats)

St Asaph East (one seat)

St Asaph West (one seat)

Trefnant (one seat)

Tremeirchion (one seat)

By-elections 2017 to 2021

Corwen

 

The by-election was called after the death of Plaid Cymru councillor, Huw "Chick" Jones. He had died in early 2020 but the by-election was delayed considerably because of the Covid-19 pandemic.

Llandrillo

References

2017 Welsh local elections
2017